The Songs for the One is the fifth studio album by South Korean musician Shin Hae-chul. It was released on 29 January 2007, under Siren Entertainment and distributed by Blue Cord Technology and Mnet Media. The album, a complete sonic departure from his previous works that were more rock-oriented, features mostly remakes of jazz and traditional pop songs in both English and Korean played by a big band, with the only new original song with lyrics being "Thank You and I Love You". The song was written by Shin (along with Yoon Chae and Peter Casey) in dedication to his wife who had given birth to their daughter the year before release.

Background 
Prior to the album's development, Shin was not known as a jazz enthusiast. He recalled wearing a bow tie and singing while listening to a mixture of Frank Sinatra, hard rock, and heavy metal — the last two genres were the kinds of music he had previously produced and released. Shin decided to release music inspired by big band orchestrations because the swing ensemble was his favourite.

Shin and his 28-member band practised for six months of preparation before participating in a simultaneous recording. They faced difficulty in recording in South Korea, so he flew to Sydney and finished sessions there in six days. Peter Casey had worked with Shin to create the album. Shin voluntarily gave up his roles in arranging the album and as the sole producer in favour of singing the lead.

Songs originally by Shin include "Inspiring Generation", "Thank You and I Love You" and "Jazz Cafe"; the latter was initially released as a song on his second studio album Myself in 1991. For promotion, Shin and his crossover band Seba held a performance titled "Shin Hae Chul Jazz scandal with seba" at the Centennial Memorial Hall of Yonsei University.

Track listing

Personnel 
This list is derived from the album booklet.

 Shin Hae-chul – executive producer and lead vocals; songwriting ("Thank You and I Love You")

 Session musicians

 Peter Casey – conducting
 Paul Panichi, Simon Sweeney, Ralph Pyl, Paul Thorne – trumpet
 Anthony Kable, Ben Gurton, Mark Barnsley – trombone
 Colin Philpott – bass trombone
 Mark Taylor – alto saxophone, clarinet, flute
 Andrew Robertson – alto saxophone, clarinet
 Graham Jesse, Adrian Cunningham – tenor saxophone, clarinet
 Stephen Fitzmaurice – baritone saxophone, bass clarinet
 Vanessa Park, Martyn Hentschel, Li Liu, Aeree Coward, Bing Xia, Dara Daly, Nicholas Parry – violin
 Andrew Marciniak – violin, viola
 Charlotte Roberts – violoncello
 Casey Poon – strings manager
 Gerald Masters – piano, keyboard
 Jonathan Zwarts – bass
 Jim Pennell – guitar, nylon guitar
 Gordon Rytmeister – drums
 Tony Azzoparadi – percussion
 Chris Kamzelas – guitar
 Oh Hee-jung (Beautiful Days) – vocals (9)
 Lee Jung-in – vocals (10)

References 

2007 albums
Jazz albums by South Korean artists
Covers albums
Korean-language albums
Stone Music Entertainment albums
Genie Music albums